Let's Face It may refer to:

 Let's Face It!, a 1941 musical with music and lyrics by Cole Porter and a book by Herbert and Dorothy Fields
 Let's Face It! (film), a 1943 film based on the musical, starring Bob Hope, Betty Hutton, ZaSu Pitts and Eve Arden
 Let's Face It (TV series), a 1963 Canadian TV series
 Let's Face It, a 1997 album from The Mighty Mighty Bosstones